Boonville Township is one of fourteen townships in Cooper County, Missouri, USA.  As of the 2000 census, its population was 9,898.

Geography
According to the United States Census Bureau, Boonville Township covers an area of 53.47 square miles (138.5 square kilometers); of this,  is land and 1.65 square miles (4.27 square kilometers, 3.08 percent) is water.

Cities, towns, villages
 Boonville
 Windsor Place

Unincorporated towns
 Billingsville at 
 Merna at 
(This list is based on USGS data and may include former settlements.)

Adjacent townships
 Franklin Township, Howard County (north)
 Moniteau Township, Howard County (northeast)
 Saline Township (east)
 Clark Fork Township (southeast)
 Palestine Township (southwest)
 Lamine Township (west)
 Pilot Grove Township (west)
 Boonslick Township, Howard County (northwest)

Cemeteries
The township contains Walnut Grove Cemetery.

Major highways
  Interstate 70
  U.S. Route 40
  Route 5
  Route 41
  Route 87
  Route 135

Airports and landing strips
 Jesse Viertel Memorial Airport

Landmarks
 Harley Park

School districts
 Boonville School District

Political districts
 Missouri's 6th congressional district
 State House District 117
 State Senate District 21

References
 United States Census Bureau 2008 TIGER/Line Shapefiles
 United States Board on Geographic Names (GNIS)
 United States National Atlas

External links
 US-Counties.com
 City-Data.com

Townships in Cooper County, Missouri
Townships in Missouri